Kurla Assembly constituency is one of the 288 Vidhan Sabha constituencies of Maharashtra state in western India. This constituency presently, after delimitation of Legislative Assembly constituencies in 2008, is reserved for the candidates belonging to the Scheduled castes

Overview
Kurla (constituency number 174) is one of the 26 Vidhan Sabha constituencies located in the Mumbai Suburban district. The number of electorates in 2009 was 284,951 (male 161,459, female 123,492).

Kurla is part of the Mumbai North Central Lok Sabha constituency along with five other Vidhan Sabha segments, namely Vile Parle, Chandivali, Kalina, Vandre West and Vandre East in the Mumbai Suburban district.

Members of Vidhan Sabha

Election results

Assembly elections 2019

Assembly elections 2014

Assembly elections 2009

Assembly elections 2004

Assembly elections 1962
 Anjanabai Narhar Magar (INC) : 34,153 votes <
 Manoharlal Mangalsain Marwah (REP) :  24656

See also
 Kurla
 List of constituencies of Maharashtra Vidhan Sabha

References

Assembly constituencies of Mumbai
Politics of Mumbai Suburban district
Assembly constituencies of Maharashtra